Kochki is a rural locality (a khutor) in Gubkinsky District, Belgorod Oblast, Russia. The population was 90 as of 2010. There are 2 streets.

Geography 
Kochki is located 47 km southwest of Gubkin (the district's administrative centre) by road. Tolstoye is the nearest rural locality.

References 

Rural localities in Gubkinsky District